Heterotrypidae is an extinct bryozoan family in the order Trepostomata.

References

External links

Prehistoric protostome families
Prehistoric bryozoans
Bryozoan families
Trepostomata
Extinct bryozoans